Adran may refer to:

Adaran (disambiguation), places in Iran
Queen Adran, a fictional character